Lambda Germán García González (born January 7, 1987) is a Mexican actor.

Biography 
García studied acting at Centro de Estudios y Formación Actoral para Televisión (CEFAT) of TV Azteca, with his teachers Dora Cordero and Raúl Quintanilla; he also attended the Broadway Dance Academy to study musical theater.

Career 
García began his acting career in the telenovela Se busca un hombre in 2007, where he played the role of Diego Villaseñor. The following year he had a supporting role in the telenovela Cachito de mi corazón. In 2009, he had a supporting role in the telenovela Pasión morena as Gustavo Sirenio. In 2011, García co-starred the telenovela Cielo rojo, where he played the role of Sebastián Rentería. The following year, he had a supporting role in the telenovela La otra cara del alma as Marcos Figueroa. In 2014, he had a supporting role in the telenovela Las Bravo where he played the role of Fernando Sánchez, a stripper.

In 2016, García appeared as a guest star in the season 4 of the television series El Señor de los Cielos, where he played the role of Nerio Pereira. In 2017, he participated in the television series Paquita la del Barrio, which is based on the life of the Mexican singer of the same name. García played the role of Antonio, the singer's uncle.

Personal life 
In December 2016, the actor was outed against his will as pictures of him with fellow actor Polo Morín were leaked to the public. Mexican magazine TVNotas had confirmed that he and Polo Morín had a relationship, but both actors denied it. It was not until July 2019, that Garcia confirmed that he was gay, and that he had a relationship with Morín. Morín came to recognize he and Lambda García were on a relationship but in July 2019 he announced they had broken up.

In November 2020 he announced that he had tested positive for COVID-19 and had to self-isolate.

Filmography

Theater

References

External links 

1987 births
21st-century Mexican male actors
Mexican male telenovela actors
Mexican male television actors
Living people
Male actors from Mexico City
Mexican male stage actors
Mexican gay actors